Willie Kirk (born 7 June 1978) is a Scottish football manager and former player who is currently the manager of FA WSL club Leicester City.

Playing career
Kirk played non-League football for Preston Athletic and agreed to manage the team in the 2014–15 Lowland Football League season.

Managerial career

Livingston FC Academy
Kirk began his managerial career at Livingston FC as an assistant academy coach for the club's under-14 team in October 2006. He advanced to head coach of the under-14 team and took over head coaching position for the next age group up to the under-17 team.

Hibernian
In March 2009, Kirk joined the academy coaching staff at Hibernian F.C. to coach the under-17 team. Ultimately, Kirk earned the head coaching position of Hibernian L.F.C. His first season in charge of Hibernian led to winning the 2010 Scottish Cup. Kirk followed up the 2010 Cup title by winning Scottish League Cup title, finishing as runners-up in the Scottish Cup, and third position in the table. The 2013 season saw Hibernian finishing second and Kirk earning Scottish Women's Football Manager of the Year award.

Bristol City
In April 2015, Kirk made the move to England and was appointed manager of Bristol City competing in the FA WSL. After a rough season, Bristol City was relegated to WSL 2, finishing in last place after the 2015 season. The relegation was short lived, as Kirk's Bristol City rallied in the WSL 2 finishing second during the WSL season and earned promotion back to the FA WSL 1. Kirk's subsequent seasons would see back-to-back eighth place finishes, maintaining safety in the women's top flight.

Manchester United
In June 2018, Kirk joined the coaching staff at the newly formed Manchester United W.F.C. as an assistant to Casey Stoney.

Everton
In December 2018, Kirk was appointed manager of Everton after being offered the number one position of a top flight team. His debut as manager of the Blues was a victory, defeating rivals Liverpool 2–1.

Kirk left his position as manager of the Everton Women’s team on 16 October 2021.

Leicester City
In July 2022, Kirk was appointed as director of football at Leicester City. On 3 November 2022, Kirk was appointed as manager following the departure of Lydia Bedford.

Managerial honours
Hibernian L.F.C.
Scottish Women's Premier League Cup
Winners (1): 2011
Scottish Women's Cup:
Winners (1): 2010
Runners-up (1): 2011

Individual
Scottish Women's Football Manager of the Year: 2013

Executive career
In July 2022, Kirk joined FA WSL club Leicester City as their first-ever director of football for both the first team and the academy.

References

External links

Willie Kirk coach profile at EvertonFC.com

Living people
Women's Super League managers
Scottish football managers
1978 births
Sportspeople from Edinburgh
Livingston F.C. non-playing staff
Bristol City W.F.C. managers
Hibernian F.C. non-playing staff
Hibernian W.F.C. managers